La Voix du Luxembourg was a French-language newspaper published in Luxembourg between 2001 and 2011.

History and profile
Published by Saint-Paul Luxembourg, La Voix was the French language supplement of Saint-Paul's flagship Luxemburger Wort until it was launched as a separate newspaper in 2001. The paper was published between Mondays and Saturdays.

La Voix was headquartered in the city of Luxembourg and had a conservative stance. The newspaper received €933,221 in annual state press subsidy in 2009.

The circulation of La Voix was 9,909 copies in 2003. In 2004 the paper had a circulation of 4,000 copies. In 2006 its circulation was 8,529 copies. It was also 4,000 copies in 2010.

On 30 September 2011, the last edition of La Voix was published.

Footnotes

External links
  La Voix du Luxembourg official website

2001 establishments in Luxembourg
2011 disestablishments in Luxembourg
Defunct newspapers published in Luxembourg
French-language newspapers published in Luxembourg
Daily newspapers published in Luxembourg
Publications established in 2001
Publications disestablished in 2011